Rishton railway station is in the southern part of the village of Rishton, Lancashire, England. This two platform station is on the East Lancashire Line, operated by Northern.

History
A wooden platform was opened on 19 June 1848, when the line was first opened by the East Lancashire Railway, at a place where the Blackburn Road crosses the railway. This was replaced by a station at the current, more convenient location at the end of Station Road in 1852.

Facilities
Only parts of each platform are now used by passenger trains. They are linked by a pedestrian footbridge and there are shelters on each one. Passenger information screens, and a long line PA system provide train running information. The station is unstaffed but it has a ticket machine that only accepts bank cards (not cash). Tickets must be purchased from the ticket machine or in advance.

As the Preston bound platform is reached by the footbridge only, step-free access is limited to the eastbound platform.

Services
Monday to Saturdays, there is an hourly service from Rishton towards Blackburn and Preston, westbound and Burnley Central and Colne, eastbound. There is a two-hourly service in each direction on Sundays.

References

External links

Rishton Website

Railway stations in Hyndburn
DfT Category F2 stations
Former Lancashire and Yorkshire Railway stations
Northern franchise railway stations
Railway stations in Great Britain opened in 1848
Railway stations in Great Britain closed in 1852
Railway stations in Great Britain opened in 1852
1848 establishments in England
Rishton